Vincent (Vinney) St. Blanc III is an American politician from the Republican Party of Louisiana. He represents District 50 in the Louisiana House of Representatives, which covers St. Mary Parish and St. Martin Parish.

References

See also 

Year of birth missing (living people)
Living people
21st-century American politicians
Republican Party members of the Louisiana House of Representatives